Nicolas Mahut and Édouard Roger-Vasselin were the defending champions, but Roger-Vasselin chose not to participate.  Mahut played alongside Sergiy Stakhovsky, but lost in the semifinals to Jonathan Erlich and Rajeev Ram.
Chris Guccione and Lleyton Hewitt won the title, defeating Erlich and Ram in the final, 7–5, 6–4.

Seeds

Draw

Draw

References
 Main Draw

Hall of Fame Tennis Championships - Doubles